Poppy Raisibe Mailola is a South African politician who serves as the Deputy Secretary-General of the Economic Freedom Fighters (EFF) party after having been elected at the party's second conference in December 2019. She succeeded Hlengiwe Mkhaliphi and serves alongside Secretary-General Marshall Dlamini.

For the 2019 elections, she was 139th on the EFF's national list and also 18th on the party's Mpumalanga provincial list.

References

External links

Living people
Economic Freedom Fighters politicians
21st-century South African politicians
Year of birth missing (living people)
21st-century South African women politicians